Penn Square may refer to the following:

Penn Square Bank, commercial bank in Oklahoma, responsible for a financial crisis in July 1982
Penn Square Mall, in Oklahoma City, Oklahoma
Penn Square, Philadelphia, location of the Philadelphia City Hall
Penn Square, a neighborhood in Lancaster, Pennsylvania